James Fraser is a former Scottish footballer.

Fraser began his career with Arbroath, and made over 200 appearances for the Red Lichties before joining Clyde. Fraser spent 7 years with the Glasgow club, and gained a reputation for being a hard man in Clyde's most successful team to date, finishing 3rd in Scotland in 1967. Fraser left Clyde in 1969 to join Dundee.

Scottish Football League players
Scottish footballers
Arbroath F.C. players
Clyde F.C. players
Dundee F.C. players
Year of death missing
Year of birth missing
Association football central defenders